Chirang District is an administrative district in the Bodoland Territorial Region of Assam state in the North-East of India.

History

It is a relatively new district in the Bodoland Territorial Region of Assam. Chirang district has been carved out from Bongaigaon district in 2004.
The word "Chirang" has derived from Garo word - "Chi" means Water and "Rang" means Rain. It may also be a copy of Tsirang District of neighbouring Bhutan. On the other hand, most of the people regarded the word Chirang is derived from the Bodo word Chirang or Sirang. Si means life and Rang means Money. Sirang was an area which is covered by valuable soil, plants, trees, flora and fauna or the things which are necessary for human life. Thus, it is a place which is important for human life or the place which is just like money or valuable for life and is later come to know Si + Rang = Sirang. After some time, the word articulated to Chirang from Sirang. And thus, the word Sirang is latter known as Chirang.

Geography

National protected area

Manas National Park (Part) - protected area.

Flora and fauna

It shares the park with four other districts.

Demographics

According to the 2011 census Chirang district has a population of 482,162, roughly equal to the nation of Suriname. This gives it a ranking of 547th in India (out of a total of 640). Its population growth rate over the decade 2001-2011 was 11.26%. Chirang has a sex ratio of 969 females for every 1000 males, and a literacy rate of 64.71%. Scheduled Castes and Scheduled Tribes made up 7.29% and 37.06% of the population respectively.

Religion
Hindus make up the majority, with 66.50%. Muslims are the second largest with 22.66%. Christians are third with 10.32%.

Language
According to the 2011 census, 37.83% of the population spoke Boro, 28.86% Bengali, 17.66% Assamese, 4.73% Santali, 4.22% Rajbongshi, 2.51% Nepali, 1.11% Kurukh and 1.06% Hindi as their first language.

Villages
 

Soulmary

References

External links
 Official website

 
Districts of Assam
Cities and towns in Chirang district
2004 establishments in Assam
Bodoland